David Adakudugu (October 23, 1968 – September 19, 2019) was a Ghanaian politician and member of the Sixth Parliament of the Fourth Republic of Ghana representing the  Tempane (New) Constituency in the Upper East Region on the ticket of the National Democratic Congress.

Personal life 
Adakudugu was a Christian (Assemblies of God Church). He was married to Akanvariva Lydia Lamisi with five children.

Early life and education 
Adakudugu was born on October 23, 1968. He hails from Basyonde, a town in the Upper East Region of Ghana. He entered Methodist University, Accra and obtained his bachelor's degree in marketing.

Politics 
Adakudugu was a member of the National Democratic Congress (NDC). In 2012, he contested for the Tempane (New) seat on the ticket of the NDC sixth parliament of the fourth republic and won.

Employment 
 Managing Director, Noryini Commercial Limited, Kasoa (2005–2009)
 District Chief Executive, Garu-Tempane Director (April, 2009–January, 2013)

Death 
Adakudugu died on the 19th of September, 2019 at the Tamale Teaching Hospital.

References

1968 births
2019 deaths
National Democratic Congress (Ghana) politicians